Ronei Gleison Rodrigues dos Reis known as Roni (born 26 January 1991) is a Brazilian footballer who plays as an attacking midfielder for São Caetano.

References

1991 births
People from São José dos Campos
Footballers from São Paulo (state)
Living people
Brazilian footballers
Association football midfielders
Mogi Mirim Esporte Clube players
São Paulo FC players
Goiás Esporte Clube players
Coritiba Foot Ball Club players
Associação Atlética Ponte Preta players
Paysandu Sport Club players
Chiapas F.C. footballers
Ceará Sporting Club players
Adanaspor footballers
C.F. Os Belenenses players
Esporte Clube São Bento players
Ituano FC players
Associação Desportiva São Caetano players
Campeonato Brasileiro Série D players
Campeonato Brasileiro Série A players
Campeonato Paranaense players
Campeonato Brasileiro Série B players
Süper Lig players
Primeira Liga players
TFF First League players
Brazilian expatriate footballers
Expatriate footballers in Turkey
Brazilian expatriate sportspeople in Turkey
Expatriate footballers in Portugal
Brazilian expatriate sportspeople in Portugal